Lu Yen-hsun was the defending champion but retired in the semifinals facing Taro Daniel.

Mikhail Youzhny won the title after defeating Daniel 6–1, 6–1 in the final.

Seeds

Draw

Finals

Top half

Bottom half

References
Main Draw
Qualifying Draw

Ningbo Challenger - Singles